Ole "Lukkøye" Klemetsen (born 30 August 1971 in Stavanger, Norway) is a retired Norwegian boxer in the Light Heavyweight division. He was nicknamed "Mister Sandman" and the "Golden Viking".

Amateur career
He medaled twice at international events and represented Norway at the 1992 Summer Olympics.

Professional career
As a pro he fought in Denmark as a light-heavyweight where he was a feared puncher with a vulnerable chin. He was European EBU Light Heavyweight champion.
His professional record is 45 victories and 6 losses. He won the (lightly regarded) titles, IBC Light Heavyweight and IBA Light Heavyweight.
His most notable bout was a 1998 IBF title challenge, where he was outpointed by Reggie Johnson.

Klemetsen retired after a bout which resulted in a loss against Thomas Hansvoll on 16 June 2001.

He featured in a documentary «Blod & Ære» that won an award at Grimstad Kortfilmfestival 2008.

He is currently a coach at the Martial Arts Institute in Stavanger. In 2005 he joined the party list of Demokratene in an effort to secure a Parliament seat for Jan Simonsen.

Professional boxing record

|-
|align="center" colspan=8|45 Wins (36 knockouts, 9 decisions), 6 Losses (4 knockouts, 2 decisions)
|-
| align="center" style="border-style: none none solid solid; background: #e3e3e3"|Result
| align="center" style="border-style: none none solid solid; background: #e3e3e3"|Record
| align="center" style="border-style: none none solid solid; background: #e3e3e3"|Opponent
| align="center" style="border-style: none none solid solid; background: #e3e3e3"|Type
| align="center" style="border-style: none none solid solid; background: #e3e3e3"|Round
| align="center" style="border-style: none none solid solid; background: #e3e3e3"|Date
| align="center" style="border-style: none none solid solid; background: #e3e3e3"|Location
| align="center" style="border-style: none none solid solid; background: #e3e3e3"|Notes
|-align=center
|Loss
|46-6
|align=left| Thomas Hansvoll
|KO
|2
|16 Jun 2001
|align=left| Brøndby Hallen, Brøndby
|align=left|
|-
|Win
|46-5
|align=left| Patrick Swann
|KO
|5
|27 Apr 2001
|align=left| Aalborg Hallen, Aalborg
|align=left|
|-
|Win
|45-5
|align=left| Thomas Hansvoll
|DQ
|2
|9 Feb 2001
|align=left| Odense Idraetshal, Odense
|align=left|
|-
|Win
|44-5
|align=left| Derrick James
|SD
|8
|6 Oct 2000
|align=left| Naestved Hallen, Naestved
|align=left|
|-
|Loss
|43-5
|align=left| Clinton Woods
|TKO
|9
|29 Apr 2000
|align=left| Wembley Arena, Wembley, London
|align=left|
|-
|Win
|43-4
|align=left| Thulani Malinga
|TKO
|8
|14 Jan 2000
|align=left| Kolding-Hallen, Kolding
|align=left|
|-
|Win
|42-4
|align=left| Robert Koon
|TKO
|4
|26 Nov 1999
|align=left| Viborg Stadionhal, Viborg, Denmark
|align=left|
|-
|Win
|41-4
|align=left| William Bo James
|KO
|3
|29 Oct 1999
|align=left| K.B. Hallen, Copenhagen
|align=left|
|-
|Win
|40-4
|align=left| Tyrone Castell
|KO
|2
|3 Sep 1999
|align=left| K.B. Hallen, Copenhagen
|align=left|
|-
|Win
|39-4
|align=left| Angelo Simpson
|UD
|8
|24 Apr 1999
|align=left| Circus Krone, Munich, Bavaria
|align=left|
|-
|Win
|38-4
|align=left| Greg Scott Briggs
|KO
|4
|13 Mar 1999
|align=left| Bowlers Exhibition Centre, Trafford, Greater Manchester
|align=left|
|-
|Win
|37-4
|align=left| Danny Juma
|RTD
|1
|13 Feb 1999
|align=left| Telewest Arena, Newcastle upon Tyne
|align=left|
|-
|Win
|36-4
|align=left| Darren Ashton
|TKO
|2
|19 Dec 1998
|align=left| Everton Park Sports Centre, Liverpool, Merseyside
|align=left|
|-
|Loss
|35-4
|align=left| Peter Oboh
|KO
|1
|26 Sep 1998
|align=left| Barbican Centre, York
|align=left|
|-
|Win
|35-3
|align=left| Artee Bright
|KO
|1
|22 Aug 1998
|align=left| Messehalle, Leipzig, Saxony
|align=left|
|-
|Loss
|34-3
|align=left| "Sweet" Reggie Johnson
|UD
|12
|29 May 1998
|align=left| Pesaro, Marche
|align=left|
|-
|Win
|34-2
|align=left| Kalin Stoyanov
|TKO
|1
|31 Jan 1998
|align=left| Lee Valley Leisure Complex, Picketts Lock, London
|align=left|
|-
|Win
|33-2
|align=left| Crawford Ashley
|TKO
|2
|4 Oct 1997
|align=left| Alexandra Palace, Muswell Hill, London
|align=left|
|-
|Win
|32-2
|align=left| Rick Camlin
|TKO
|3
|12 Jul 1997
|align=left| Olympia, Kensington, London
|align=left|
|-
|Win
|31-2
|align=left| Eduardo Cruz
|KO
|3
|13 Jun 1997
|align=left| Antvorskovhallen, Slagelse
|align=left|
|-
|Win
|30-2
|align=left| Rodney Toney
|TKO
|2
|2 May 1997
|align=left| Randers Hallen, Randers
|align=left|
|-
|Win
|29-2
|align=left| Vinson Durham
|PTS
|8
|30 Nov 1996
|align=left| Arena Nova, Wiener Neustadt
|align=left|
|-
|Win
|28-2
|align=left| Jimmy Matz
|KO
|1
|15 Nov 1996
|align=left| Naestved Hallen, Naestved
|align=left|
|-
|Win
|27-2
|align=left| Luan Morina
|KO
|1
|29 Jun 1996
|align=left| Erith, London
|align=left|
|-
|Loss
|26-2
|align=left| Mohamed Siluvangi
|PTS
|12
|2 Apr 1996
|align=left| Elephant & Castle Centre, Southwark
|align=left|
|-
|Win
|26-1
|align=left| Lenzie Morgan
|KO
|2
|3 Feb 1996
|align=left| Levallois-Perret, Hauts-de-Seine
|align=left|
|-
|Win
|25-1
|align=left| Julio Abel Gonzalez
|KO
|2
|29 Nov 1995
|align=left| York Hall, Bethnal Green, London
|align=left|
|-
|Win
|24-1
|align=left| Michael Dale
|KO
|1
|21 Sep 1995
|align=left| Battersea Town Hall, Battersea, London
|align=left|
|-
|Win
|23-1
|align=left| Charles Oliver
|PTS
|10
|9 Jun 1995
|align=left| Kolding-Hallen, Kolding
|align=left|
|-
|Win
|22-1
|align=left| Nigel Rafferty
|TKO
|4
|17 May 1995
|align=left| Ipswich, Suffolk
|align=left|
|-
|Win
|20-1
|align=left| Eric L. French
|PTS
|10
|31 Mar 1995
|align=left| Detroit
|align=left|
|-
|Win
|19-1
|align=left| John Mitchell
|KO
|2
|17 Mar 1995
|align=left| K.B. Hallen, Copenhagen
|align=left|
|-
|Win
|18-1
|align=left| James Hayes
|KO
|2
|18 Feb 1995
|align=left| Bath & West Country Showground, Shepton Mallet, Somerset
|align=left|
|-
|Win
|17-1
|align=left| Earl Butler
|TKO
|1
|11 Nov 1994
|align=left| Randers Hallen, Randers
|align=left|
|-
|Win
|16-1
|align=left| Eric A. Brown
|KO
|3
|7 Oct 1994
|align=left| K.B. Hallen, Copenhagen
|align=left|
|-
|Win
|15-1
|align=left| Rocky Gannon
|KO
|1
|16 Sep 1994
|align=left| Aalborg Hallen, Aalborg
|align=left|
|-
|Win
|14-1
|align=left| Karl Willis
|KO
|2
|10 Jun 1994
|align=left| Kolding-Hallen, Kolding
|align=left|
|-
|Win
|13-1
|align=left| Etienne Obertan
|KO
|5
|22 Apr 1994
|align=left| Aalborg Hallen, Aalborg
|align=left|
|-
|Win
|12-1
|align=left| Juan Alberto Barrero
|KO
|2
|18 Feb 1994
|align=left| Randers Hallen, Randers
|align=left|
|-
|Win
|11-1
|align=left| Simon McDougall
|KO
|5
|29 Jan 1994
|align=left| Wales National Ice Rink, Cardiff
|align=left|
|-
|Win
|10-1
|align=left| Carl Jones
|UD
|6
|6 Nov 1993
|align=left| Las Vegas
|align=left|
|-
|Win
|9-1
|align=left| Tony Booth
|UD
|8
|17 Sep 1993
|align=left| Cirkusbygningen, Copenhagen
|align=left|
|-
|Win
|8-1
|align=left| Jeff Medley
|KO
|4
|6 May 1993
|align=left| The Riviera, Las Vegas
|align=left|
|-
|Win
|7-1
|align=left| Nigel Rafferty
|KO
|2
|14 Apr 1993
|align=left| Kensington, London
|align=left|
|-
|Loss
|6-1
|align=left| John McClain
|TKO
|1
|9 Mar 1993
|align=left| Casino Magic, Bay Saint Louis, Mississippi
|align=left|
|-
|Win
|6-0
|align=left| David Picha
|TKO
|2
|27 Feb 1993
|align=left| Capital City Gymnasium, Beijing
|align=left|
|-
|Win
|5-0
|align=left| Bob Charlez
|PTS
|6
|30 Jan 1993
|align=left| Las Vegas
|align=left|
|-
|Win
|4-0
|align=left| John Kaighin
|KO
|3
|28 Jan 1993
|align=left| Mayfair, London
|align=left|
|-
|Win
|3-0
|align=left| Steve Osborne
|KO
|1
|10 Dec 1992
|align=left| York Hall, Bethnal Green, London
|align=left|
|-
|Win
|2-0
|align=left| Joe Wallace
|KO
|1
|25 Nov 1992
|align=left| Las Vegas
|align=left|
|-
|Win
|1-0
|align=left|Armando Dragone
|KO
|1
|21 Oct 1992
|align=left| Las Vegas
|align=left|
|}

References

Link to the movie "Blod & Ære "https://web.archive.org/web/20100112064509/http://www.blodogare.no/.

External links

Boxers at the 1992 Summer Olympics
Olympic boxers of Norway
1971 births
Living people
Norwegian male boxers
Sportspeople from Stavanger
AIBA World Boxing Championships medalists
Light-heavyweight boxers